James Anthony may refer to:

James Anthony (musician) (born 1955), Canadian musician
James C. Anthony, medical professor at Michigan State University
James Anthony (psychoanalyst) (1916–2014), British psychoanalyst

See also
Anthony James (disambiguation)